Pyroteuthis is a genus of squid in the family Pyroteuthidae. It is differentiated from the genus Pterygioteuthis by size, head shape and behaviour. Species within the genus are separated by the arrangement of tentacular photophores; the shape of the hectocotylus, and the shape of the hectocotylus hooks. With the exception of the Tropical Eastern Pacific, the genus is circumpolar in tropical and temperate oceans. The species P. addolux is the only member to occur in the North Pacific.

References

External links
Tree of Life web project: Pyroteuthis

Squid
Cephalopod genera
Bioluminescent molluscs
Taxa named by William Evans Hoyle